Pfixx Solar Montferland Run is an annual 15-kilometres road running competition held in 's-Heerenberg, Montferland, Netherlands. It was first organised in 1996 and typically takes place on the first Sunday in December.

Unlike many elite level road races, the course for the Montferland Run is a difficult, hilly one which does not easily allow for internationally fast times. The start and finish point of the race is in the old town area of 's-Heerenberg. The course has traces a circuit through the Montferland Forest and passes the small, nearby villages of Stokkum, Beek and Zeddam. The race includes both elite athlete and fun runners, and there is also a shorter 7.5 km race. In order to preserve the surrounding environment and retain the character of the races, the competition is limited to 3500 entries per year.

The Montferland Run is one of the fastest 15 km races in the world. Many top national and international athletes have competed in ’s-Heerenberg, including: Kamiel Maase, Abdi Nageeye, Khalid Khannouchi, Reuben Kosgei, Richard Limo, Kenenisa Bekele, Abel Kirui, Geoffrey Mutai, Wilson Kipsang, Stephen Kiprotich, Dennis Kimetto, Conseslus Kipruto, Constantina Dita, Edna Kiplagat, Sifan Hassan, Lornah Kiplagat, Meseret Defar and of course Haile Gebrselassie and Paula Radcliffe.

The course records for the 15 km race are held by East African athletes: Geoffrey Koech of Kenya ran the men's record of 42:13 minutes in 2019 and Ethiopian Tsigie Gebreselama's run of 47:29 minutes in 2019 is the best women's time. She ran a new world best time U20

The course was previously sponsored by the Wincanton Group and its current sponsor (since 2012) is Pfixx Solar.

Past winners
Key:

See also
Zevenheuvelenloop, another prominent 15K race in the Netherlands

References

List of winners
Historie. Montferland Run. Retrieved on 2011-12-04.

External links 
Official website

15K runs
Athletics competitions in the Netherlands
Recurring sporting events established in 1996
1996 establishments in the Netherlands
Sports competitions in Gelderland
Sport in Montferland